Wonewoc Spiritualist Camp is a Spiritualist Church community, of the Modern Spiritualist movement, located in Wonewoc, Wisconsin. The camp is open every summer.

Notes

External links
 

Buildings and structures in Juneau County, Wisconsin
Religion in Wisconsin
Spiritualist communities in the United States